Riverbend Township is a township in northeastern Gaston County, North Carolina, United States. As of the 2010 census, it had a population of 26,596.

It contains the northern portion of the city of Mount Holly, most of the town of Stanley, and a small portion of the town of Spencer Mountain, as well as the unincorporated communities of Mountain Island and Lucia.

References

Townships in Gaston County, North Carolina
Townships in North Carolina